Mogibacterium diversum  is a Gram-positive, anaerobic, rod-shaped and non-spore-forming bacterium from the genus of Mogibacterium which has been isolated from the human mouth.

References

External links
Type strain of Mogibacterium diversum at BacDive -  the Bacterial Diversity Metadatabase

Eubacteriaceae
Bacteria described in 2002